This is a list of National Hockey League (NHL) players who have played at least one game in the NHL from 1917 to present and have a last name that starts with "G".

List updated as of the 2018–19 NHL season.

Ga

 Marian Gaborik
 Kurtis Gabriel
 Jonah Gadjovich
 Bill Gadsby
 Link Gaetz
 Joaquin Gage
 Jody Gage
 Art Gagne
 Paul Gagne
 Pierre Gagne
 Simon Gagne
 Dave Gagner
 Sam Gagner
 Aaron Gagnon
 Dave Gagnon
 Germain Gagnon
 Johnny Gagnon
 Sean Gagnon
 Bob Gainey
 Steve Gainey
 Norman "Dutch" Gainor
 Maxim Galanov
 Michel Galarneau
 Percy Galbraith
 Alex Galchenyuk
 Brendan Gallagher
 John Gallagher
 Brett Gallant
 Gerard Gallant
 Garry Galley
 Jamie Gallimore
 Don Gallinger
 Simon Gamache
 Joseph Gambardella
 Bruce Gamble
 Dick Gamble
 Troy Gamble
 Dylan Gambrell
 Gary Gambucci
 Perry Ganchar
 Dave Gans
 Ryan Garbutt
 Bert Gardiner
 Bruce Gardiner
 Chuck Gardiner
 Herb Gardiner
 Bill Gardner
 Cal Gardner
 Dave Gardner
 George Gardner
 Paul Gardner
 Rhett Gardner
 Danny Gare
 Ray Gariepy
 Conor Garland
 Scott Garland
 Rob Garner
 Tyrone Garner
 Michael Garnett
 Mathieu Garon
 Johan Garpenlov
 Dudley "Red" Garrett
 John Garrett
 Jason Garrison
 Mike Gartner
 Bob Gassoff
 Brad Gassoff
 Dave Gatherum
 Steve Gatzos
 Adam Gaudette
 Frederick Gaudreau
 Johnny Gaudreau
 Rob Gaudreau
 Armand Gaudreault
 Leo Gaudreault
 Michael Gaul
 Jean-Marc Gaulin
 Dallas Gaume
 Brendan Gaunce
 Cameron Gaunce
 Paul Gaustad
 Art "Nosey" Gauthier
 Daniel Gauthier
 Denis Gauthier
 Fern Gauthier
 Frederik Gauthier
 Gabe Gauthier
 Jean Gauthier
 Julien Gauthier
 Luc Gauthier
 Paul Gauthier
 Sean Gauthier
 Jocelyn Gauvreau
 Aaron Gavey
 Stewart Gavin
 Vladislav Gavrikov
 Glenn Gawdin
 Luke Gazdic

Ge

 Bob Geale
 George "Hully" Gee
 Morgan Geekie
 Gary Geldart
 Eric Gelinas 
 Martin Gelinas
 Jack Gelineau
 Jean-Guy Gendron
 Martin Gendron
 Chay Genoway
 Bernie "Boom-Boom" Geoffrion
 Blake Geoffrion
 Dan Geoffrion
 Alexandar Georgiev
 George "Gerry" Geran
 Eddie Gerard
 Nathan Gerbe
 Martin Gerber
 Eric Germain
 Carsen Germyn
 Ken Gernander
 Shane Gersich
 Bruno Gervais
 Ray Getliffe
 Timothy Gettinger
 Ryan Getzlaf

Gi

 Eddie Giacomin
 Mario Giallonardo
 Barry Gibbs
 Christopher Gibson
 Don Gibson
 Doug Gibson
 John Gibson (born 1959)
 John Gibson (born 1993)
 Roy "Gus" Giesebrecht
 Lee Giffin
 Brandon Gignac
 Jean-Sebastien Giguere
 Dennis Gilbert
 Ed Gilbert
 Gilles Gilbert
 Greg Gilbert
 Jeannot Gilbert
 Rod Gilbert
 Tom Gilbert
 Stan Gilbertson
 Brent Gilchrist
 Curt Giles
 Randy Gilhen
 Andre Gill
 Hal Gill
 Todd Gill
 Don Gillen
 Farrand Gillie
 Clark Gillies
 Colton Gillies
 Jon Gillies
 Trevor Gillies
 Jere Gillis
 Mike Gillis
 Paul Gillis
 Doug Gilmour
 John Gilmour
 Matt Gilroy
 Gaston Gingras
 Brian Gionta
 Stephen Gionta
 Mark Giordano
 Bob Girard
 Jonathan Girard
 Ken Girard
 Samuel Girard
 Daniel Girardi
 Zemgus Girgensons
 Alexandre Giroux
 Art Giroux
 Claude Giroux
 Larry Giroux
 Pierre Giroux
 Raymond Giroux
 Jeff Giuliano

Gl

 Bob Gladney
 Jean-Paul Gladu
 Cody Glass
 Jeff Glass
 Tanner Glass
 Ben Gleason
 Tim Gleason
 Curtis Glencross
 Luke Glendening
 Brian Glennie
 Scott Glennie
 Matt Glennon
 Rob Globke
 Lorry Gloeckner
 Danny Gloor
 Fred Glover
 Howie Glover
 Mike Glumac
 Brian Glynn

Go

 Marcel Goc
 Sascha Goc
 Eric Godard
 Ernie Godden
 Warren Godfrey
 Eddy Godin
 Sammy Godin
 Alexander Godynyuk
 Pete Goegan
 Dave Goertz
 Steven Goertzen
 Bob Goldham
 Erich Goldmann
 Nikolay Goldobin
 Bill Goldsworthy
 Leroy Goldsworthy
 Glenn Goldup
 Hank Goldup
 Alex Goligoski
 Cody Goloubef
 Yan Golubovsky
 Scott Gomez
 Sergei Gonchar
 Daniel Goneau
 Billy Gooden
 Larry Goodenough
 Ebbie Goodfellow
 Barclay Goodrow
 Paul Goodman
 Viktor Gordiuk
 Andrew Gordon
 Boyd Gordon
 Fred Gordon
 Jack Gordon
 Robb Gordon
 Scott Gordon
 Lee Goren
 Tom Gorence
 Josh Gorges
 Butch Goring
 Dave Gorman
 Edwin Gorman
 Brandon Gormley
 Benoit Gosselin
 David Gosselin
 Guy Gosselin
 Mario Gosselin
 Shayne Gostisbehere
 Steve Gotaas
 Johnny Gottselig
 Tyrell Goulbourne
 Bobby Gould
 John Gould
 Larry Gould
 Michel Goulet
 Cliff Goupille
 Yanni Gourde
 David Gove
 Chris Govedaris
 David Goverde
 Gerry Goyer
 Phil Goyette

Gr

 Michael Grabner
 Tony Graboski
 Mikhail Grabovski
 Evgeny Grachev
 Bob Gracie
 Thomas Gradin
 Marc-Andre Gragnani
 Dirk Graham
 Leth Graham
 Pat Graham
 Rod Graham
 Ted Graham
 John Grahame
 Ron Grahame
 Tony Granato
 Jean-Luc Grand-Pierre
 Markus Granlund
 Mikael Granlund
 Alex Grant
 Benny Grant
 Danny Grant
 Derek Grant
 Doug Grant
 Benoit Gratton
 Chris Gratton
 Dan Gratton
 Gilles Gratton
 Josh Gratton
 Norm Gratton
 Kevin Gravel
 Leo Gravelle
 Adam Graves
 Hilliard Graves
 Ryan Graves
 Steve Graves
 Alex Gray
 Gerry Gray
 Harrison Gray
 Terry Gray
 Denis Grebeshkov
 Anthony Greco
 Josh Green
 Mike Green (born 1979)
 Mike Green (born 1985)
 Red Green
 Rick Green
 Ted Green
 Travis Green
 Wilfred "Shorty" Green
 Andy Greene
 Matt Greene
 Colin Greening
 Jeff Greenlaw
 Mike Greenlay
 Kyle Greentree
 Jordan Greenway
 A. J. Greer
 Randy Gregg
 Noah Gregor
 Bruce Greig
 Mark Greig
 Alexandre Grenier
 Lucien Grenier
 Martin Grenier
 Richard Grenier
 Ron Greschner
 Brent Gretzky
 Wayne Gretzky
 Mike Grier
 Brent Grieve
 George Grigor
 Mikhail Grigorenko
 Stu Grimson
 John Grisdale
 Francois Groleau
 Stanislav Gron
 Tuomas Gronman
 Lloyd Gronsdahl
 Jari Gronstrand
 Michal Grosek
 Jordan Gross
 Lloyd Gross
 Nicklas Grossmann
 Don Grosso
 Leonard Grosvenor
 Wayne Groulx
 Philipp Grubauer
 John Gruden
 Danny Gruen
 Scott Gruhl
 Carl Grundstrom
 Eric Gryba
 Bob Gryp
 Matt Grzelcyk

Gu

 Francois Guay
 Paul Guay
 Radko Gudas
 Erik Gudbranson
 Steve Guenette
 Nate Guenin
 Jake Guentzel
 Daniel Guerard
 Stephane Guerard
 Bill Guerin
 Jocelyn Guevremont
 Brendan Guhle
 Aldo Guidolin
 Bep Guidolin
 Robert Guindon
 Ben Guite
 Carl Gunnarsson
 Steve Guolla
 Miloslav Guren
 Denis Gurianov
 Alexei Gusarov
 Nikita Gusev
 Sergei Gusev
 Ravil Gusmanov
 Derek Gustafson
 Bengt-Ake Gustafsson
 David Gustafsson
 Erik Gustafsson
 Per Gustafsson
 Filip Gustavsson
 Jonas Gustavsson
 Peter Gustavsson
 Kevan Guy

See also
 hockeydb.com NHL Player List - G

Players